Rangpur Technical School and College is a public educational institution located at Kachari Bazar in Rangpur, Bangladesh. It was formerly named Government Technical School and College. This is the only one school and college of Rangpur City where science, technology and engineering  could be studied throughout the high school level.

Accreditation
Rangpur Technical School and College received a level 1 bronze certificate of accreditation from Asia Pacific Accreditation and Certification Commission (APACC) on 10 September 2008.

References

External links
 

Educational institutions established in 1852
Rangpur, Bangladesh
1852 establishments in India
Schools in Bangladesh